R packages are extensions to the R statistical programming language. R packages contain code, data, and documentation in a standardised collection format that can be installed by users of R, typically via a centralised software repository such as CRAN (the Comprehensive R Archive Network). The large number of packages available for R, and the ease of installing and using them, has been cited as a major factor driving the widespread adoption of the language in data science.

Compared to libraries in other programming language, R packages must conform to a relatively strict specification. The Writing R Extensions manual specifies a standard directory structure for R source code, data, documentation, and package metadata, which enables them to be installed and loaded using R's in-built package management tools. Packages distributed on CRAN must meet additional standards. According to John Chambers, whilst these requirements "impose considerable demands" on package developers, they improve the usability and long-term stability of packages for end users.

Repositories

Comprehensive R Archive Network (CRAN) 
The Comprehensive R Archive Network (CRAN) is R's central software repository, supported by the R Foundation. It contains an archive of the latest and previous versions of the R distribution, documentation, and contributed R packages. It includes both source packages and pre-compiled binaries for Windows and macOS. , more than 16,000 packages are available. CRAN was created by Kurt Hornik and Friedrich Leisch in 1997, with the name paralleling other early packing systems such as TeX's CTAN (released 1992) and Perl's CPAN (released 1995). , it is still maintained by Hornik and a team of volunteers. The master site is located at the Vienna University of Economics and Business and is mirrored on servers around the world.

The "Task Views" page (subject list) on the CRAN website lists a wide range of tasks (in fields such as finance, genetics, high performance computing, machine learning, medical imaging, meta-analysis, social sciences and spatial statistics) for which R packages are available. Another way to browse CRAN packages is provided by Metacran, which also maintains lists of featured, most downloaded, trending or most depended upon packages.

The number of CRAN packages has grown exponentially for many years, and  an average of 21 submissions of new or updated packages were made every day. Since each submission is manually reviewed by a small team of CRAN maintainers, many of whom, according to R core developer Peter Dalgaard, are "approaching pensionable age", there is a concern that this system is not sustainable in the long term. The growth of CRAN has exposed limitations of its dependency management infrastructure, particularly the fact that it assumes that dependencies always refer to the latest version of a package, meaning that new releases of CRAN packages must always be backwards compatible, and that CRAN packages cannot have dependencies that are not on CRAN. It has also led to concerns about declining quality of packages.

MRAN and RStudio Package Manager
The Microsoft R Application Network (MRAN) is a mirror of CRAN maintained by Microsoft which is based on the company's downstream distribution of R, Microsoft R Open (formerly Revolution R Open). It also includes an archive of daily CRAN snapshots, branded as the "CRAN Time Machine", which enables users of MRAN to bypass the dependency versioning limitations of CRAN by installing a fixed set of R package versions via the package checkpoint.

RStudio Package Manager is a similar tool produced by RStudio, which in addition to CRAN snapshots includes an archive of R packages from Bioconductor and Python packages from the Python Package Index. It also distributes pre-compiled binary packages for Linux (only Windows and macOS binaries are included on CRAN).

Other repositories 

The Bioconductor project provides R packages for the analysis of genomic data. This includes object-oriented data-handling and analysis tools for data from Affymetrix, cDNA microarray, and next-generation high-throughput sequencing methods.

R-Forge, is a central platform for the collaborative development of R packages, R-related software, and projects. R-Forge also hosts many unpublished beta packages, and development versions of CRAN packages.

Base and recommended packages 
R is distributed with fifteen "base packages": base, compiler, datasets, grDevices, graphics, grid, methods, parallel, splines, stats, stats4, tcltk, tools, translations, and utils.

In addition, there are fifteen "recommended packages" from CRAN which are included with binary distributions of R: KernSmooth, MASS, Matrix, boot, class, cluster, codetools, foreign, lattice, mgcv, nlme, nnet, rpart, spatial, and survival.

Other packages
A group of packages called the Tidyverse, which can be considered a "dialect of the R language", is increasingly popular in the R ecosystem. As of 2020-06-13, Metacran listed 7 of the 8 core packages of the Tidyverse in the list of most download R packages. The group of packages strives to provide a cohesive collection of functions to deal with common data science tasks, including data import, cleaning, transformation and visualisation (notably with the ggplot2 package).

The R Infrastructure packages support coding and the development of R packages and as of 2021-05-04, Metacran lists 16 of these packages among the 25 most downloaded packages.

See also
 Tidyverse
 ggplot2
 knitr

References

Further reading

External links 
 The Comprehensive R Archive Network (CRAN) 
 METACRAN, a directory of R packages
CRAN Task Views, listing of CRAN packages by topics

R (programming language)